Mostyn Mangau  is a senior police officer in the Solomon Islands.

In 2014 Mangau was honoured with a British Empire Medal.  Four other officers received similar honours.

In February 2018, Mangau announced an initiative to destroy rogue crocodiles observed near Bonegi, Guadalcanal, and assured the public that managing the crocodile population was a priority for the police.

He was promoted to Deputy Commissioner of Police from Assistant Commissioner of Police, on October 24, 2019.  He was also appointed to the Royal Solomon Islands Police Force Executive.  His responsibilities include National Security.

Mangau attended the commissioning of the RSIPV Gizo in his capacity of acting police commissioner.  He called the Gizo the "pride of the fleet".

References

Living people
Solomon Islands police officers
Recipients of the British Empire Medal
Year of birth missing (living people)